Chinnalapatti is a municipal town in Dindigul district, Tamil Nadu in India with a total population of about 26285 (as per 2011 census). In 2021 most of the wards are merged to accommodate it to 18 wards, as chinnalapatti is still a town panchayat. It is understood that the number of voters are 29000 and population would be around 42000. Making it the largest town panchayat in Dindigul district. The town is well known for the handloom sarees and garments. The place is located next to Sirumalai hills which has lot of grapes farmlands.

Demographics
According to the 2011 India census, Chinnalapatti had a population of 26,285. Males constitute 50% of the population and females compose the other 50%. Chinnalapatti has an average literacy rate of 87.06%. This is higher than the state average of 80.09%; with male literacy of 93.12% and female literacy of 81.23%. 8.51% of the population is under 6. The town's economy is based on textiles and agriculture. Agriculture dominates North Chinnalapatti.

Chinnalapatti Town Panchayat hosts over 6,981 houses (as per 2011 India census) to which it supplies basic amenities including water and sewage. It is authorized to build roads within Town Panchayat limits and impose taxes.

Administration 
Chinnalapatti city is divided into 21 wards, for which elections are held every 5 years.

Economy

Chinnalapatti's economy mainly depends on the handloom weaving industry and is known for it.  Weaving has been a way of life in Chinalapatti for centuries.   Workers produce cotton (Sungudi) saris with Zari borders, which are accepted for daily wear. The Sungudi saree industry includes looming, weaving, dyeing and printing units.  The Sungudi industry provides a livelihood for more than 10,000 workers. Textile export and import is an important complementary business. Sungudi sarees from Chinnalapatti are exported to Singapore, Malaysia, Sri Lanka and South Africa. The town is active in areas such as wet grinder assembly, wire chair production, Alimarh production and dyeing.

Sarees

Silk sarees (famously known as "Chinnalappattu") and Sungudi sarees are made in the traditional way. Since saris are less common in many places, Chinnalapatti weavers expanded to make increasingly popular sungudi chudithars.

Culture

Most of people in Chinnalapatti are conservative Hindus and practice traditional festivals.

Notable festivals include kalla Alagar, North street muthalamman, Bheedhi Devru Mokku (street worship of God in Kannada) and Sri Ramalinga Sowdeeswari Amman Festival.

They also celebrate Kamayasamy, the festival for “Cupid – the god of love” annually, a tradition held for the past 140 years. It runs for twelve days ending on a full moon.

Transport

Chinnalapatti is on National Highway 7 (NH7) which connects Madurai with Dindigul.  It has a bus facility with buses operated by Government and private sectors. Mofussil buses operate along NH-7.

Ambaturai is the nearest railway station. Passenger and some express trains stop there.

Madurai Airport is the nearest airport.

Hospitals
The medical needs of the town and surrounding villages are served by multiple hospital facilities in the town. Some of the well known hospitals are
Kasturba hospital is the oldest hospital spreading in acres, serves large number of patients every day. The hospital is now a multi specialty hospital and known for its maternity centers with more than 300 beds.
Shanmugam nursing home - multi specialty hospital well known for maternity center in the town.
Harish hospital - multi specialty hospital located near Poonjolai
Govt. Health center - serves many of the people in the town and from nearby villages
Lakshmi Seva Sangam - Biggest Siddha product manufacturing center. Siddha doctors visit outpatients at particular time every day.

Education

Schools 
Anugraha international school(IGCSE)
Luxor world school(IGCSE)
Sakthi Velavan Vidhyalaya(CBSE)
Cheran Vidhyalaya Matric Higher Secondary School
Thambithottam Higher Secondary School
Victory Matriculation Higher Secondary School
Devangar Higher Secondary School
Devangar Girls High School 
Govt. High School (Near Market)
Prism Matric School
RC High School
Kalaimagal Nursery and Primary School
Siriyamalar Primary School
Thilagam Primary School
Anbu Primary School
Kendriya Vidyalaya(CBSE)

Colleges
Gandhigram University
Faculty of rural health and sanitation
Aravindar polytechnic college
Vijay institute of management
Lakshmi college of education
Gandhigram institute of rural health and family welfare trust

Landmark
The town has several Hindu temples and churches. Sri Anjali Varadha Anjaneyar temple is located at Mettupatti location and contains a  16 feet high Anjaneyar god statue.

References

External links
https://chinnalapatti.home.blog/  -----------   Detailed information about Chinnalapatti is given in this blog.
http://www.chinnalapattiinfo.com

Cities and towns in Dindigul district